The Hasdingi were one of the Vandal peoples of the Roman era. The Vandals were Germanic peoples, who are believed to have spoken an East Germanic language, and were first reported during the first centuries of the Roman empire in the area which is now Poland, eastern Germany, the Czech Republic, and Slovakia.

Famously, the Hasdingi led a successful invasion of Roman North Africa, creating a kingdom with its capital at Carthage in what is now Tunisia.

During the Marcomannic wars, the Hasdingi helped the Romans and were able to settle in the Carpathian and Pannonian areas which are now in Hungary and Romania. At the end of 405, they participated together with Silingi Vandals and Sarmatian Alans in the crossing of the Rhine. Their king Godigisel lost his life in battle against the Franks during the crossing.

After some years in Gaul, these peoples moved into the Iberian peninsula.

The Hasdingi settled in Gallaecia (today Galicia, Asturias and the north of Portugal) along with the Suebi in 409 AD and their kingdom was one of the earliest Barbarian territories to be founded before the fall of the Western Roman Empire.

Gunderic, Godegisel's successor as king of the Hasdingi, lost his kingdom to king Hermeric of the Suebi in 419 after the Battle of the Nervasos Mountains where the Vandals were overwhelmed by an allied force of Suebi and Romans. He fled to Baetica with his army where he became king of the Silingi Vandals and of the Alans.

Gunderic was succeeded by his brother Gaiseric in 428 AD, who subsequently fled from Iberia to North Africa where he established a kingdom at Carthage.

See also

Haddingjar, who appear to be late reflections of the Hasdingi in Norse mythology.
Migrations period
The western Alans and Vandals
Timeline of Germanic kingdoms

References
 Hydatii Episcopi Chronicon 

Vandals
Early Germanic peoples
Foederati